Contrarian is an extreme metal band from Rochester, New York, founded in 2012 by guitarist Jim Tasikas. The band is known for its progressive and catchy songwriting alongside a technical playing style. They are known as one of the front runners at introducing an authentic yet modern approach to the progressive style of the 1990s progressive death metal bands such as Atheist, Death, and Cynic. The band featured famed Nile drummer George Kollias for their first three albums.

History 
The band was originally formed in 2012 in Rochester, New York, by Jim Tasikas. Jim then enlisted his friend Ed Paulsen for bass duties, Brian Mason as lead guitar and George Kollias of Nile for drums. Contrarian roots came from the progressive and technical metal scene birthed in Rochester, NY in the mid-1990s which also brought to light bands such as Lethargy, Mastodon, Psyopus and Sulaco. Contrarian recorded their first EP "Predestined" in 2014. This EP caught the attention of Jason Tipton at Willowtip Records and within one year the band released their first full-length album Polemic on November 20, 2015. The band's latest album Only Time Will Tell was also released via Willowtip Records in 2020, mixed by famed record producer Neil Kernon. Contrarian has had guest appearances from Paul Masvidal of Cynic and Leon Macey of Mithras UK and as of 2020, guitarists Jim Tasikas and Brian Mason are endorsed by ESP guitars. Contrarian are known for their detailed album art covers and concept albums dealing with themes of philosophy and theology. Contrarian are also known for reviving an organic approach to recording technical metal in studio settings.

Members 
Current
 Jakob Sin - vocals (2022 - present)
 Brian Mason – guitars (2014–present)
 Jim Tasikas – guitars (2014–present)
 Bill Bodily – bass (2019–present) (Flotsam and Jetsam)
 Alex Cohen – drums (2022–present) (ex-Pyrrhon, ex-Imperial Triumphant)

Former
 Cody McConnell – vocals (2015, 2019–2021
 Leon Macey – guitars (2014–2016)
 Ed Paulsen – bass (2014–2019)
 George Kollias – drums (2014–2019), vocals (2015–2019) (Nile)
 Bryce Butler – drums (2019–2022) (Shadow of Intent, Abigail Williams, ex-The Faceless)

Timeline

Discography

Studio albums 
 Predestined  (2014)
 Polemic (2015)
 To Perceive Is to Suffer (2017)
 Their Worm Never Dies (2019)
 Only Time Will Tell (2020)

References

External links 
 Official Facebook page

Musical groups established in 2012
Musical quintets
2012 establishments in New York (state)